Barypeithes is a genus of beetles belonging to the family Curculionidae.

The genus was first described by Jacquelin du Val in 1854.

The species of this genus are found in Europe.

Species:
 Barypeithes araneiformis
 Barypeithes mollicomus
 Barypeithes pellucidus
 Barypeithes trichopterus

References

Entiminae
Curculionidae genera